Gegharkunik is a Gavar Municipality of the village in the Gegharkunik Province of Armenia.

Etymology 
The village was known as Bashkend until 1946.

History 
The village was founded in 1828 by emigrants primarily from Gavar. The village contains a small church, and St. Gevorg Church on a hill nearby.

Gallery

References

External links 

 World Gazeteer: Armenia – World-Gazetteer.com
 
 

Populated places in Gegharkunik Province